Various newspapers endorsed candidates in the 2016 United States presidential election, as follows. Tables below also show which candidate each publication endorsed in the 2012 United States presidential election (where known) and include only endorsements for the general election. Primary endorsements are separately listed - see Newspaper endorsements in the United States presidential primaries, 2016.

Among the United States' 100 largest newspapers by paid circulation, 57 endorsed Democratic candidate Hillary Clinton, while only two, the Las Vegas Review-Journal and the Florida Times-Union, endorsed Republican presidential nominee Donald Trump. Four (the Chicago Tribune, the Detroit News, the Richmond Times-Dispatch, and the Charleston (South Carolina) Post and Courier) endorsed Libertarian candidate Gary Johnson, while three other newspapers (USA Today, the Fort Worth Star-Telegram, and the Milwaukee Journal-Sentinel) specifically discouraged their readers from voting for Trump.  Clinton won support from not only traditionally Democratic-leaning newspapers, but also traditionally non-political and conservative newspapers, including those that had "...either never before supported a Democrat or had not in many decades ... or had never endorsed any presidential candidate, like USA Today."

Trump received endorsements from only 20 daily newspapers and six weekly newspapers nationwide, of which only two, the Las Vegas Review-Journal and the (Jacksonville) Florida Times-Union, had circulations of above 100,000. The small number of endorsements received by Trump was unprecedented in American history for a candidate from a major party.

Media journalist Jim Rutenberg wrote in early October 2016 that endorsements in the 2016 presidential election were distinguished by "blunt condemnation" of Trump and by a "save the Republic" tone. A handful of newspapers endorsed third party candidates, including independent candidate Evan McMullin and Libertarian Party nominee Gary Johnson; endorsing a candidate outside the two major parties is rare.

Summary of newspaper and magazine endorsements in the 2016 United States presidential election

Daily newspapers

Summary of daily newspapers

Endorsements by daily newspapers

Weekly newspapers 
This list includes newspapers that publish three or fewer times per week.

Summary of weekly newspapers

Endorsements by weekly newspapers

Magazines

Summary of magazines

Endorsements by magazines

College and university newspapers

Summary of student newspapers

Endorsements by student newspapers

Foreign newspapers and magazines

Summary of foreign periodicals

Endorsements by foreign periodicals

See also 
 Newspaper endorsements in the United States presidential primaries, 2016

References

External links 
The American Presidency Project: 2016 General Election Editorial Endorsements by Top 100 Newspapers Based on Daily Circulation

2016 United States presidential election endorsements
2016 in mass media
Newspaper endorsements
2010s politics-related lists